KKXK (94.1 FM, 94 Kix Country) is a radio station broadcasting a country music format. Licensed to Montrose, Colorado, United States, the station is currently owned by Townsquare Media.

History
The station went on the air as beautiful music station KUBC-FM in 1977. On August 5, 1981, the station changed its call sign to the current KKXK.

References

External links
 
 
 FCC History Cards for KKXK

KXK
Radio stations established in 1977
Townsquare Media radio stations